World Publications (Anderson World Books, Inc., Anderson World Publications, Anderson World, or Bob Anderson Publications) was a book and magazine publisher in the late 1960s-1980s started by Bob Anderson.

Publications

References

Companies based in Mountain View, California
Defunct book publishing companies of the United States
Magazine publishing companies of the United States
Mass media in the San Francisco Bay Area
Publishing companies established in the 1960s
Publishing companies based in the San Francisco Bay Area